James McSherry (July 29, 1776 – February 3, 1849), was an American politician from Pennsylvania who served as a Federalist member of the U.S. House of Representatives for Pennsylvania's 5th congressional district from 1821 to 1823.

Early life and education
McSherry was born in Littlestown, Pennsylvania, to Irish immigrant Patrick McSherry and was educated at the Lancaster Academy.

Military service
He fought in the War of 1812 in the defense of Baltimore, Maryland.

Business career
He was a founder of the Littlestown Railroad and the Gettysburg National Bank.

Political career
He served in the Pennsylvania House of Representatives (1807–1812).  He served as a member of the Pennsylvania State Senate for the 11th district from 1813 to 1817 and was the first Roman Catholic state senator in Pennsylvania.  He was a delegate to the Pennsylvania State Constitutional Convention in 1837 and 1838. In 1821, he was elected by the Federalist party to the Seventeenth United States Congress (1821–1823).

Defeated in his re-election bid, he returned to the Pennsylvania State House of Representatives (1824–1830; 1834 and 1835).

Death and legacy
He died on February 3, 1849, and is interred at the Saint Aloysius Cemetery in Littlestown, Pennsylvania.

His son, James McSherry Jr. was a lawyer and writer best known for his "History of Maryland".  His grandson, James McSherry became chief judge of the supreme court U.S. State of Maryland Court of Appeals.

The town of McSherrystown, Pennsylvania, is named in honor of his family.

Sources

The Political Graveyard

1776 births
1849 deaths
19th-century American politicians
Federalist Party members of the United States House of Representatives from Pennsylvania
Members of the Pennsylvania House of Representatives
Pennsylvania state senators
People from Littlestown, Pennsylvania
People from Pennsylvania in the War of 1812